Albu Hamid (also Romanized as Ālbū Ḩamīd and Ālbū Hamīd) is a village in Minubar Rural District, Arvandkenar District, Abadan County, Khuzestan Province, Iran. At the 2006 census, its population was 1,623, in 307 families.

References 

Populated places in Abadan County